Elevator Suite is a three piece electronic pop group. They were formed in January 1999 by the English DJ Andy Childs, his friend DJ Paul "Robbo" Roberts, and Steve Grainger, who was working as a record producer of a small recording studio in Totnes, Devon.

The group uses a mixture of rock, jazz and house. Their first single was "Man in a Towel" which gained popularity in the UK and was followed by two more songs ("Barefoot" and "Weekend Wonderboy"). Their first two singles were both crowned as BBC Radio 1’s 'Record of the Week', and thereafter they toured Europe in support of Morcheeba.

Their debut album, Barefoot & Shitfaced, was released on 25 October 1999 on Infectious Records. Their track, "Back Around", peaked at No. 71 in the UK Singles Chart in August 2000.

They released their self-titled second album on 9 October 2007 on Pure Mint Recordings. Included on this album is a cover of The Beatles' song, "Eleanor Rigby". The 2007 line-up consists of Roberts on vocals, Dan Brown on bass (formerly of Ilya), Childs (vocals/tambourines/producer/arranger), Dan Moore (keyboards – has played with Cousteau, Fred Wesley, and Roni Size), and Jock (drums – an illustrator for DC Comics). The latter's publication The Losers is being developed into a film with Jack Nicholson.

"The Wheel" was released as a single on 26 November 2007, and included remixes by Phil Hartnoll of Orbital, and Alex Metric.

Discography
 Barefoot & Shitfaced (1999)
 Elevator Suite (2007)

References

External links
 Elevator Suite on Myspace
 Elevator Suite on Last.fm
 Artist page on Pure Mint's site
 
 "The Wheel" single review on musicomh.com
 "Elevator Suite" album review on thebeatsurrender.co.uk

English rock music groups
Jazz fusion musicians
British DJs
British techno music groups
English pop music groups
Trip hop groups
Electronic dance music DJs